Binod Sethi  is a social worker, philanthropist, and a businessman of Dimapur, Nagaland in Northeast India. He is one of the first industrialists in Nagaland. He is a pioneer in Nagaland plywood industry having founded the Reliable Products Ltd in 1987, a leading plywood manufacturer of its time. He has served as the vice-president of  Digambar Jain Samaj, Dimapur  and  the advisor of the Shree Digambar Jain Girls' College Dimapur for over 18 years.

Early life and education
He was born on 10 October 1957, in Dimapur, Nagaland to  Phulchand Sethi and Lada Devi Sethi. He completed his early  education from Government High School Dimapur. He then graduated from Guwahati Commerce College. He was active in college politics and was Social Welfare Secretary of the college in 1978. His father was one of the founding fathers of the Jain community in Nagaland.

Personal life
Binod Sethi was married to Sona Devi Sethi in 1980. He has 2 sons and 2 daughters. He is the Chairman of Smt Sona Devi Sethi Charitable trust, which donated and  constructed the tallest statue of Vasupujya in Champapur, Bhagalpur, Bihar, and stands 31 feet in height. The Panch Kalyanak of the Statue of Vasupujya  was conducted in February - March 2014.

Career
Sethi has been involved with various businesses. He has served as the Vice President of Shree Digmabar Jain Samaj Dimapur and the advisor of SD Jain Girls College Dimapur for more than 18 years. He set up a citronella oil factory at Khat Khati, Assam in 1982 and a saw-mill in 1985. He founded the plywood business Reliable Products Ltd. in 1987. He is also the vice president Teerth Sanrakshini Mahasabha, a branch of the Digambar Jain Mahasabha. His theory about the sealing of denomination has been widely appraised. He has also been instrumental in the installation of an ancient idol of Adinath by building a temple in Purulia, West Bengal. He has also contributed significantly to the construction of the Statue of Ahimsa in Mangi Tungi, the tallest Jain idol in the world. He is also the Chairman of Smt Sona Devi Sethi Charitable trust, based at Dimapur Nagaland. The trust is involved in various  charitable activities in the field of education and health care. Binod Sethi was awarded the Governor's Commendation certificate by the Chief Minister of Nagaland on 15 August 2018.

See also
Jainism in Nagaland

References

Citation

Sources 
 
 
 
 
 
 
 
 

1957 births
20th-century Indian Jains
21st-century Indian Jains
Indian philanthropists
People from Dimapur
Living people
Businesspeople from Nagaland
Indian industrialists
20th-century Indian businesspeople
21st-century Indian businesspeople